Staņislavs Petkēvičs (7 November 1908 – 29 December 1960) was a Latvian-Polish long-distance runner. He competed in the men's 5000 metres at the 1928 Summer Olympics.

Career
He took part in the 1928 Summer Olympics in Amsterdam representing Latvia and claiming 7th place in the 5000 m race. Since 1929, he represented Poland. He trained at the KS Warszawianka Sports Club and was one of the major rivals of Janusz Kusociński.

In 1938, he graduated from the Józef Piłsudski University of Physical Education in Warsaw. He was a three-time Polish Champion, and thirteen-time Polish record holder in the 1500 m, 2000 m, 3000 m, 5000 m, 10 000 m as well as 800-200-400-200 m relay races. In 1929, he became one of few athletes who won against Paavo Nurmi. In 1929, he was chosen the Polish Sportspersonality of the Year.

Between 1934-1939, he worked as a coach of Polish middle- and long-distance runners team. In 1939, he emigrated to Argentina and worked as a PE teacher. In 1945, he established the Instituto de Cúltura Física in Buenos Aires.

See also
Polish Sportspersonality of the Year
Sport in Poland
List of Poles

References

1908 births
1960 deaths
Athletes (track and field) at the 1928 Summer Olympics
Latvian male long-distance runners
Olympic athletes of Latvia
Place of birth missing
Athletes from Riga
Polish male long-distance runners
Polish athletes